Murray Two Dam or Murray 2 Dam is a major ungated concrete arch dam with a controlled spillway across Khancoban Bank, a diverted flow of the Snowy and Geehi rivers in the Snowy Mountains region of New South Wales, Australia. The impounded reservoir is called the Murray Two Pondage or Murray 2 Pondage.

History
The structure was completed by Thiess Brothers in 1968, and is one of the sixteen major dams that comprise the Snowy Mountains Scheme, a vast hydroelectricity and irrigation complex constructed in south-east Australia between 1949 and 1974 that is now run by Snowy Hydro.

Location and features
The dam was constructed by a consortium including Thiess Bros Pty Limited and Dillingham Corporation based on engineering plans developed under contract from the Snowy Mountains Hydroelectric Authority.

At 100% capacity the dam wall holds back  of water. The controlled spillway is capable of discharging .

Power generation

Located immediately upstream of the Murray Two Pondage is the Murray 1 Power Station, a  conventional hydroelectric power station. Meanwhile, located immediately downstream is the Murray 2 Power Station, a  conventional hydroelectric power station. Water from the power plant is discharged into the reservoir, before passing over the spillway of Khancoban Dam, and down the Swampy Plain River.

See also

 Kosciuszko National Park
 List of dams and reservoirs in New South Wales
 Snowy Hydro Limited
 Snowy Mountains Scheme
 Snowy Scheme Museum

References

External links
 

Snowy Mountains Scheme
Arch dams
Dams in New South Wales
Dams completed in 1968
Kosciuszko National Park
Murray-Darling basin
Snowy Valleys Council